Scott Wesley Brown (born June 4, 1952) is an American CCM singer and songwriter. He has recorded 25 albums and toured in over 50 countries.

Biography 
Brown was born in Philadelphia, Pennsylvania. He recorded for Sparrow Records for much of his career, releasing 25 albums; his songs have been covered by other Christian artists – including Petra, Pat Boone, Bruce Carroll, Sandi Patty, and Amy Grant – and by opera star Plácido Domingo. Brown has also worked with organizations such as Promise Keepers and Campus Crusade for Christ, and was a worship pastor in San Diego.

Brown toured extensively internationally to over 50 countries. Before recording songs and touring with dozens of artists, he met Steve Camp, then an unknown artist fresh out of high school, who would also sing backup while playing acoustic guitar with Brown on "I'm Not Religious, I Love the Lord", just a year before Camp launched his own solo career.

Scott Wesley Brown has worked closely with the U.S. Center for World Mission and ACMC (Advancing Churches in Missions Commitment), and teaches many worship and mission seminars in addition to maintaining an active concert schedule. He received his ordination from the Southern Baptist Convention in 1998 but has continued his seminary education through Phoenix and Westminster seminaries.

In the early part of this decade, Brown teamed up with Billy Smiley of the popular Christian rock band Whiteheart to produce a series of albums of contemporary hymn arrangements. Hymns, The Old Made New was released in 2006.

Discography

References

External links
 

1952 births
American performers of Christian music
Singer-songwriters from Pennsylvania
Living people
Musicians from Philadelphia
People from Fairfax County, Virginia
Singer-songwriters from Virginia
American male singer-songwriters
Singer-songwriters from Washington, D.C.